Revelation is a 1918 American silent drama film directed by George D. Baker and starring Alla Nazimova. The film was produced and distributed through Metro Pictures.

A print of the film has been preserved.

Plot
As described in a film magazine, Joline (Nazimova), a young dancer, attracts the attentions of a young artist, Paul (Bryant), and she consents to pose for him. He receives a commission to paint a picture of the Madonna beside a sacred rose bush at a monastery. Events bring Joline to a realization of her useless life and she leaves Paul to devote the rest of her life to a good cause. The war reunites the two lovers when Paul, a soldier, is wounded and Joline is called on care for him.

Cast
Charles Bryant as Paul Granville
Alla Nazimova as Joline
Frank Currier as The Prior
Syn De Conde as Duclos
Bigelow Cooper as Count Adrian de Roche
John Martin as Fra Augustine
Eugene Borden as Pierre
Phil Sanford as Mestaire (credited as Philip Sanford)
True James as The Monastery Gatekeeper
D.H. Turner as German Officer (credited as Dave Turner)
Fred Radcliffe as Patin
A.C. Hadley as Fochard
Hazel Washburn as Madeleine Brevort

References

External links

Film stills at silenthollywood.com

1918 films
American silent feature films
Metro Pictures films
Films directed by George D. Baker
1918 drama films
Silent American drama films
American black-and-white films
1910s English-language films
1910s American films